Hormotilopsis is a genus of green algae in the family Chaetopeltidaceae.

References

Chlorophyceae genera
Chaetopeltidales